Centroclisis is a genus of antlions (Myrmeleontidae) with about 56 species occurring in Africa and Asia. They are known as bark antlions - during the day they rest on the bark of trees, with their wings flattened. At night they may be attracted to lights.

Species

Centroclisis maligna
Widespread and fairly common in the drier western parts of southern Africa. It can distinguished from other Centroclisis species by its reddish colour. The larvae are large and robust; they live in sandy soils, but do not make pitfall traps.

Centroclisis vitanda
This species is endemic to South Africa; it is known only from the Eastern Cape, Northern Cape and Free State provinces. The male has long ectoprocts. During the day it normally rests, well camouflaged, on bark. Its immature stages are poorly known, but the larvae probably live in sandy soils.

References

Myrmeleontidae genera
Acanthaclisini